The 2019 Ivy League women's basketball tournament was a women's college conference tournament held March 16 and 17, 2019, at the Payne Whitney Gymnasium on the campus of Yale University in New Haven, Connecticut. Princeton defeated Penn to earn the Ivy League's automatic bid to the 2019 NCAA tournament.

Seeds
Only the top four teams in the 2018–19 Ivy League regular-season standings will participate in the tournament and be seeded according to their records in conference play, resulting in a Shaughnessy playoff.

Schedule

*Game times in Eastern Time. #Rankings denote tournament seeding.

Bracket

References

 

Ivy League women's basketball tournament
2018–19 Ivy League women's basketball season
Ivy League Women's B
College basketball tournaments in Connecticut
Sports competitions in New Haven, Connecticut